Povljana is a village and municipality on the island of Pag, in Zadar County, Croatia. It is located 12 km southeast of town of Pag. The nearby shoreline has steep slopes and small cliffs.

According to the 2011 census, there are 759 inhabitants, 95% of whom are Croats.

References

Municipalities of Croatia
Seaside resorts in Croatia
Populated places in Zadar County
Pag (island)